Major-General Frank William Ramsay  (10 December 1875 – 1 October 1954) was a senior British Army officer in the First World War.

Military career

Ramsay transferred from the militia into the Middlesex Regiment on 15 May 1897.

He served with the Mounted infantry before the First World War. In the war, he served as commander of 48th Brigade and participated in the Battle of Messines in 1917. He went on to be General Officer Commanding 58th (2/1st London) Division in June 1918.

In 1925 he took command over a Brigade of the Quetta Division until he retired in 1929. Later he lived in Holbrook Hall, Sudbury.

Ramsey was awarded the Distinguished Service Order (DSO) in 1916 and appointed Companion of the Order of St Michael and St George (CMG) in 1917 and Companion of the Order of the Bath (CB) in 1919.

Works
"Polo Pony Training with Some Hints on the Game" London and Portsmouth, Gale & Polden (1928)

References

External links

 

1875 births
1954 deaths
British Army generals of World War I
Place of birth missing
Place of death missing
Middlesex Regiment officers
British Army personnel of the Second Boer War
Companions of the Distinguished Service Order
Companions of the Order of St Michael and St George
Companions of the Order of the Bath
British polo players